Sergei Adamovich Kovalyov  (also spelled Sergey Kovalev; ; 2 March 1930 – 9 August 2021) was a Russian human rights activist and politician. During the Soviet period he was a dissident and, after 1975, a political prisoner.

Early career and arrest

Kovalyov was born in the town of Seredyna-Buda, near Sumy (in Soviet Union, now Ukraine). In 1932, his family moved to Podlipki village near Moscow. In 1954, Kovalyov graduated from Moscow State University and in 1964 he gained a PhD in biophysics. As a biophysicist, Kovalyov was author of more than 60 scientific publications. From the mid-1950s onwards, as a graduate student and a lecturer he opposed Trofim Lysenko's theories, then favored by Khrushchev and the ruling Communist Party of the Soviet Union.

In 1969 Kovalyov was one of a group of dissidents who set up the Action Group for the Defense of Human Rights in the USSR, the first such independent body in the Soviet Union. The 14 members of the group first drew public and international attention when they and 38 supporters signed an Appeal about political persecution in the USSR and sent it, over the head of the Soviet government, to the United Nations; meanwhile a number of them also became involved as authors and editors in the samizdat (self-published) human rights quarterly, the Chronicle of Current Events (1968–1983) which first appeared in April 1968. The members of the Action Group came under pressure from the authorities  and their statements and activities became intermittent.

After signing the May 1969 Appeal to the UN Human Rights Commission Sergei Kovalyov went on to sign many statements and appeals, in defense of other dissidents, authors and rights activists: Vladimir Bukovsky, Mustafa Dzhemilev, Pyotr Grigorenko, Viktor Khaustov, Viktor Nekipelov, Leonid Plyushch, Yuri Shikhanovich, Aleksandr Solzhenitsyn and Gabriel Superfin. (See the charge sheet at his 1975 trial in Vilnius.)

Following the arrest of Pyotr Yakir in June 1972 the Chronicle did not appear for over a year. On 7 May 1974, Kovalyov, Tatyana Velikanova and Tatyana Khodorovich gave a press conference for foreign journalists, declaring their determination to renew distribution of the bulletin, starting with the three postponed issues. (They were among the editors of the Chronicle but did not admit so at the time.) As a consequence two of them were arrested and imprisoned and the third, Tatyana Khodorovich, was forced into emigration. Kovalyov was the first to be detained. He was arrested on 27 December 1974 in Moscow and twelve months later he was put on trial in the Lithuanian capital Vilnius, charged with "anti-Soviet agitation and propaganda" . Sentenced to ten years imprisonment and exile under Article 70, a "particularly grave crime against the State", Kovalyov served seven years in strict-regime penitentiary facilities for political prisoners (Perm-36 in the Urals and Chistopol Prison in Tatarstan) followed by three years of exile in Kolyma in the Soviet Far East. On completing his sentence at the end of 1984, he was allowed to settle in Kalinin (today Tver) in central Russia.

Perestroika, 1985–1991
The six years of reform initiated by the last Soviet leader Mikhail Gorbachev, often referred to as perestroika and glasnost, led to the release in 1987 of hundreds of political prisoners from the camps, from exile and from psychiatric hospitals, and lifted residence restrictions from those who had completed their sentences. Kovalyov was thus allowed to return to Moscow in 1987.

He became actively involved in a number of organisations that emerged then. In 1989, for instance, Andrei Sakharov recommended him as a co-director of the Project Group for defense of Human Rights, the short-lived Russian-American Human Rights Group. Some bodies like the "Glasnost" press club and the International Humanitarian Conference (December 1987) did not outlast the period: the Gorbachev Politburo was not keen to allow former dissidents to organise national or international gatherings, as their discussions reveal. The Politburo and the KGB were similarly wary of Memorial, another new organisation that survives until this day. Its dual focus on the repressive Soviet past and the human rights issues of the present, made it particularly suitable for Kovalyov's involvement and he served as its co-chairman for many years after 1990.

Post-Soviet Russia

After the dissolution of the Soviet Union, Kovalyov turned to official politics. In January 1991, he coauthored the Declaration of Human and Civil Rights in Russia and was a major contributor to Article 2 (Rights and Liberties of Man and Citizen) of the Constitution of the Russian Federation.

From 1990 to 1993, he was an elected People's Deputy of the Russian Federation, and a member of the Presidium of the Supreme Council of the Russian Federation. He served as the chairman of the President's Human Rights Commission and Human Rights Commissioner for the Russian parliament, the State Duma.

From 1993 until 2003, Kovalyov was a member of the Russian State Duma. From 1996 to 2003 he was also a member of the Russian delegation to the Parliamentary Assembly of the Council of Europe and a member of the Assembly's Committee on Legal Affairs and Human Rights.

In 1993, he co-founded the movement and later, the political party Choice of Russia (Выбор России), later renamed Democratic Choice of Russia (Демократический выбор России).

Since 1994, Kovalyov, then Yeltsin's human rights adviser, has been publicly opposed to Russia's military involvement in Chechnya. From Grozny, he witnessed the realities of the First Chechen War. His daily reports via telephone and on TV galvanized Russian public opinion against the war. For his activism, he was removed from his post in the Duma in 1995. In 1994, he was awarded the Homo Homini Award for human rights activism by the Czech group People in Need.

Kovalyov has been an outspoken critic of authoritarian tendencies in the administrations of Boris Yeltsin and Vladimir Putin. In 1996, he resigned as head of Yeltsin's presidential human rights commission, having published an open letter to Yeltsin, where Kovalyov accused the president of giving up democratic principles. In 2002, he organized a public commission to investigate the 1999 Moscow apartment bombings (the Kovalyov Commission), which was effectively paralyzed after one of its members, Sergei Yushenkov, was assassinated, another member, Yuri Shchekochikhin, allegedly  poisoned with thallium, and its legal counsel and investigator, Mikhail Trepashkin, arrested.

In 2005, he participated in They Chose Freedom, a four-part television documentary on the history of the Soviet dissident movement.

Kovalyov opposed the 2008 Russian invasion of Georgia and following Russian recognition of the self-proclaimed Georgian breakaway states Abkhazia and South Ossetia.

In March 2010, Kovalyov signed the online anti-Putin manifesto of the Russian opposition, "Putin must go".

Kovalyov spoke out against the 2014 Russian annexation of Crimea and Russia's military, political, and economic support for the self-proclaimed Ukrainian breakaway states Donetsk People's Republic and Luhansk People's Republic.

Kovalyov died aged 91 in his sleep in Moscow on 9 August 2021.

Awards
Kovalyov is a recipient of numerous awards and honorary titles. In 2004, he was awarded the Victor Gollancz Prize by the Society for Threatened Peoples, for documenting Russian crimes in Chechnya. Kovalyov was also a joint recipient, with Anna Politkovskaya and Lyudmila Alexeyeva, of the 2004 Olof Palme Prize.
In 2011, he was honored with the Lithuanian Freedom Award for his adherence to democratic values and ideals of freedom.

Works

Books

Articles

References

Further reading

External links
 Kovalyov at Amnesty International
 Putin critic loses post, platform for inquiry
 Kovalyov is one of recipients of 1995 Democracy Award at National Endowment for Democracy
  Bio at hrights.ru
  Bio at hro.org
  2001 Interview
  2002 Interview
 
 
 
 
 

1930 births
2021 deaths
People from Sumy Oblast
Moscow State University alumni
Russian biophysicists
Soviet dissidents
Soviet human rights activists
Russian dissidents
Russian human rights activists
Russian political activists
Soviet prisoners and detainees
Amnesty International prisoners of conscience held by the Soviet Union
Moscow Helsinki Group
Amnesty International people
Memorial (society)
Ombudsmen in Russia
Democratic Choice of Russia politicians
Yabloko politicians
Olof Palme Prize laureates
Recipients of the Order of Tomáš Garrigue Masaryk
Recipients of the Order of the Cross of Terra Mariana, 3rd Class
Officiers of the Légion d'honneur
Grand Crosses of the Order of Merit of the Republic of Poland
Russian political writers
20th-century Russian writers
Russian prisoners and detainees
First convocation members of the State Duma (Russian Federation)
Second convocation members of the State Duma (Russian Federation)
Third convocation members of the State Duma (Russian Federation)